The 1869 Taieri by-election was a by-election held on 19 June 1869 during the 4th New Zealand Parliament in the Otago electorate of .

The by-election was caused by the resignation of the incumbent MP Donald Reid. The by-election was won by Henry Howorth. The runner-up was Thomas Culling, with six candidates having contested the election.

Results

References

By-elections in New Zealand
1869 elections in New Zealand
Politics of Dunedin
1860s in Dunedin